Vyacheslav Andreyevich Larents (born 21 September 1994) is a Russian football player. He plays for FC Novosibirsk.

Club career
He made his debut in the Russian Second Division for FC Sibir-2 Novosibirsk on 23 July 2013 in a game against FC Yakutiya Yakutsk.

He made his Russian Football National League debut for FC Sibir Novosibirsk on 12 July 2014 in a game against FC Volgar Astrakhan.

References

External links
 Career summary by sportbox.ru
 

1994 births
People from Novosibirsk Oblast
Living people
Russian footballers
Association football defenders
Association football midfielders
FC Tom Tomsk players
FC Sibir Novosibirsk players
FC Irtysh Omsk players
Sportspeople from Novosibirsk Oblast